Del's is a brand of frozen lemonade typically found in Rhode Island and southeastern Massachusetts during the summer months. Del's lemonade is available in 20 states. Frozen lemonade is a kind of slush. It is made from water, concentrate, and real lemons in an ice cream machine. In Rhode Island and southeastern Massachusetts "Del's" is synonymous with frozen lemonade.

History
Del's was founded by Angelo DeLucia, who originally received the recipe for lemonade from his father, Franco DeLucia, who brought the recipe to the United States from Italy. Angelo then developed a machine to dispense their product.

The first Del's stand was a small, pushable cart in Cranston, Rhode Island, in 1948. Soon afterwards, Angelo started using "Del's Trucks" to serve the beverage anywhere in the state. The company still uses the trucks today in addition to its storefront locations.

In 1993, Rhode Island legislature made an attempt to select an official state beverage. Del's lemonade and coffee milk were chosen as "finalists"; however, coffee milk was eventually chosen as the official state beverage.

The 2011 television movie Lemonade Mouth, a Disney Channel Original Movie adapted from the book of the same name by Massachusetts author Mark Peter Hughes, prominently features "Mel's Frozen Lemonade", which the author has indicated is a parody of Del's.

Angelo DeLucia died of prostate cancer on September 6, 2013.

Products
There are seven main flavors of the popular drink: lemon, watermelon, peach-mango, blueberry, cherry, grapefruit, and blood orange. There are occasionally extra seasonal flavors, like tangerine.  Coffee was once a flavor but has not appeared on the menu for many years. Del's also sells other various products such as pretzel sticks, candy, and popcorn.

In partnership with Del's, the Narragansett Brewing Company produces a shandy called Del's Shandy.

Distribution
Del's operates franchises selling their prepared product, with 20 locations in Rhode Island, the most of any state, as well as locations throughout the US, and even internationally.  Trucks selling the product are often seen at popular beach locations in summer months. The Del's "take-home" mix and non-frozen variety of lemonade can be found in grocery stores throughout the world.

See also
 List of frozen dessert brands
 List of lemonade topics

References

External links
 Del's website

Frozen drinks
Brand name frozen desserts
Rhode Island cuisine
Lemonade
Restaurants in Rhode Island
Rhode Island culture
1948 establishments in Rhode Island